was a Haiku poet in Japan during the Meiji period.

Life 
Samukawa was born in Matsuyama (now in Ehime Prefecture) on November 3, 1875. He became a student at Daisan Kōtō gakkō (now Kyoto University) in 1894. Samukawa met Kawahigashi Hekigotō and Takahama Kyoshi at this school. Samukawa was so absorbed in writing haiku that in the end, he dropped out of the school. He worked at the Kyoto Newspaper and the Osaka Asahi Newspaper and continued to contribute haiku to the magazine Hototogisu even while he worked.

Samukawa went to Tokyo and joined the staff of the newspaper Nippon in 1898. He met the journalist Kuga Katsunan and Masaoka Shiki there. Samukawa became Shiki's pupil and studied the narrative prose, or the sketch in prose, that Shiki propounded. After Shiki's death, Samukawa stopped writing Hokku poetry and concentrated on writing prose, travel sketches and essays. He devoted the rest of his life from 1911 onwards to keeping Shiki's house and estate.

Works 
 : A selection
 : The introduction of Masaoka Shiki

References 
  written by   
  written by   

Japanese essayists
1875 births
1954 deaths
20th-century Japanese poets
20th-century essayists
Japanese haiku poets
People from Matsuyama, Ehime